Government Mahila Engineering College, Ajmer is an engineering college for women in Ajmer city in Rajasthan state in India. It was established  in 2007 and is said to be the first women engineering college in north India. The college is now affiliated with Bikaner Technical University and is approved by AICTE.

References

Women's engineering colleges in India
Women's universities and colleges in Rajasthan
Engineering colleges in Ajmer
University of Rajasthan
Educational institutions established in 2008
2008 establishments in Rajasthan